Dora "Dorchen" Richter (16 April 1891 – presumed 1933) was the first known person to undergo complete male-to-female gender reassignment surgery. She was one of a number of transgender people in the care of sex-research pioneer Magnus Hirschfeld at Berlin's Institute for Sexual Research during the 1920s and early 1930s. She underwent surgical removal of the testicles in 1922, followed in 1931 by removal of the penis and vaginoplasty.

Biography 
Richter was born as the oldest child of six to a poor farming family in Bohemian Ore Mountains region in 1891. Early in childhood, Richter displayed a "tendency to act and carry on in a feminine way". At the age of 6 years, she apparently tried to remove her penis with a tourniquet. 

In 1909, after a baker apprenticeship she left her small town and moved to a bigger one, where she continued to dress as a girl in her free time. She joined a wandering theater troupe and got to Leipzig, where she stayed for two years. In 1916 she got drafted to the army, but got discarded in just two weeks. From Leipzig she came back to her hometown, where she was encouraged by a friend to go to Hirschfeld's practice in Berlin. From May 1923, Richter worked with other transgender people as a domestic servant at the Institute for Sexual Research, one of the few places where a trans person could be employed, where she was affectionately known as Dorchen. In 1922, she underwent an orchiectomy. In 1931, a psychiatrist working at the institute, published a paper about Richter's (and Toni Ebel's) gender confirming surgeries as a case study in Zeitschrift für Sexualwissenschaft und Sexualpolitik: "Her castration had the effect – albeit not very extensive – of making her body become fuller, restricting her beard growth, making visible the first signs of breast development, and giving the pelvic fat pad... a more feminine shape."

In early 1931, Richter had a penectomy performed by institute physician Ludwig Levy-Lenz, and in June that year an artificial vagina was surgically grafted by Berlin surgeon Erwin Gohrbandt, making her the first transgender woman of whom records remain to undergo vaginoplasty. In late 1931, she was working as a cook in Restaurant Kempinski (modern Hotel Bristol) at Kurfürstendamm 27. 

In 1933, footage of Dora and two other Hirschfeld trans patients, Toni Ebel and Charlotte Charlaque (all anonymously/uncredited) was used as a documentary segment in an Austrian movie Mysterium des Geschlechtes (Mystery of Sex) about contemporary sexology.

In May 1933, with growing Nazi influence in Germany (Hirschfeld had fled the country), a mob of students attacked the institute, and the state authorities then burned its records. Richter's fate after this attack is not known. Nowadays it is presumed that she was either killed in the attack or was arrested after it and died in custody. However, in 1955, Charlotte Charlaque, who fled Germany to Karlsbad in 1933, wrote in a pseudonymized article about Hirschfeld "sex change" patients, that Dora Richter, "[...] born in Karlsbad, Bohemia[...] soon became an owner of a small restaurant in the city of her birth".

References 

1891 births
1933 deaths
German LGBT people
Transgender women
Victims of anti-LGBT hate crimes
People murdered in Nazi Germany
20th-century LGBT people